The 1926 Miami Hurricanes football team represented the University of Miami during the 1926 college football season. The team was only a freshman team, but was the first to play football for the university. Before competition took place, plans for a 50,000-seat stadium were proposed by university president Bowman Ashe. Work began on a temporary, 8,000-seat structure when on September 17, 1926, a hurricane destroyed much of South Florida, killing more than 130 people, and removing any plans of a football stadium. This postponed the season, and gave the team its nickname of "Hurricanes."

Schedule

References

Miami
Miami Hurricanes football seasons
College football undefeated seasons
Miami Hurricanes football